PS-103 Karachi East-V is a constituency of the Provincial Assembly of Sindh.

General elections 2013

General elections 2008

See also
 PS-104 Karachi East-VI
 PS-106 Karachi East-VIII

References

Constituencies of Sindh